"The Ballad of Go Go Brown" is a song by the British new wave and synth-pop band Heaven 17, which was released in 1988 as the lead single from their fifth studio album Teddy Bear, Duke & Psycho. The song was written and produced by Glenn Gregory, Ian Craig Marsh and Martyn Ware. "The Ballad of Go Go Brown" reached No. 91 in the UK Singles Chart and remained in the top 100 for two weeks.

Background
As a significant shift away from the band's usual electronic sound, "The Ballad of Go Go Brown" has a country-influenced sound and features a prominent use of guitars. Martyn Ware told Music Week in 1988, "[The song was released as a single] because it was so unusual. The world doesn't need another re-launch of a group that sounds exactly the same."

Critical reception
On its release, Adam Blake of Music Week wrote, "Certainly blues harp and rock 'n' roll bass lines are hardly what one associates with Heaven 17, but with its hard-edged lyric about a teenaged drug-pusher and its admirably uncluttered arrangement, 'Go Go Brown' deserves attention." Mica Paris, as guest reviewer for Number One said, "I think this is quite nice. Very country and western. I liked their older stuff a lot, but they've really moved away from that. This is OK but I couldn't handle too much of it." Andrew Hirst of the Huddersfield Daily Examiner considered it to be a "rocky country ballad complete with quivering guitar twangs and doleful harmonica". He felt the single would either "sink out of sight or shoot spectacularly up to the top slot".

William Shaw of Smash Hits criticised the band for dropping their original sound and "trying to pretend to be some ancient old 'rhythm and blues' group". He said of the song, "This is a shockingly awful song. It's annoyingly nonsensical and it chugs along at such a relentlessly dismal pace." In a retrospective review of Teddy Bear, Duke & Psycho, Aaron Badgley of AllMusic commented, "Worth the price of the album is the out of character country-tinged 'The Ballad of Go Go Brown.' Heaven 17 had never sounded like this before, and it demonstrated their versatility."

Formats
7-inch single
"The Ballad of Go Go Brown" - 3:43
"I Set You Free" - 5:08

12-inch single
"The Ballad of Go Go Brown (Extended Version)" - 4:37
"The Ballad of Go Go Brown (7" Version)" - 3:43
"The Ballad Of Go Go Brown (Version)" - 4:29
"I Set You Free" - 5:08

CD single
"The Ballad of Go Go Brown (Extended Version)" - 4:37
"I Set You Free" - 5:09
"The Ballad of Go Go Brown (7" Version)" - 3:43
"Slow All Over" - 6:36

Personnel
Heaven 17
 Glenn Gregory
 Martyn Ware
 Ian Craig Marsh

Additional personnel
 Assorted Images - design and sleeve producer
 Jean Pierre Masclet - photography

Charts

References

1988 songs
1988 singles
Heaven 17 songs
Songs written by Martyn Ware
Songs written by Glenn Gregory
Songs written by Ian Craig Marsh
Virgin Records singles